The 1984 Navy Midshipmen football team represented the United States Naval Academy as an independent during the 1984 NCAA Division I-A football season.

Schedule

Personnel

Season summary

at North Carolina

Virginia

at Arkansas

at Air Force

Lehigh

Princeton

at Pittsburgh

vs Notre Dame

at Syracuse

South Carolina

vs Army

References

Navy
Navy Midshipmen football seasons
Navy Midshipmen football